Creamery is an unincorporated community in Skippack Township in Montgomery County, Pennsylvania, United States. Creamery is located at the intersection of Pennsylvania Route 113 and Creamery Road.

References

Unincorporated communities in Montgomery County, Pennsylvania
Unincorporated communities in Pennsylvania